Logan R. Darnell (born February 2, 1989) is an American former professional baseball pitcher. He made his Major League Baseball (MLB) debut with the Minnesota Twins in 2014 and played for the Uni-President Lions of the Chinese Professional Baseball League (CPBL). He played college baseball at the University of Kentucky.

Career

Minnesota Twins
The Twins added him to their 40-man roster during the 2013-14 offseason. He was called up to the majors for the first time on May 2, 2014. He also played with Bravos de Margarita and Cardenales de Lara in the Venezuelan Baseball League

Somerset Patriots
On March 15, 2017, Darnell signed with the Somerset Patriots of the Atlantic League of Professional Baseball for the 2017 season.

Los Angeles Dodgers
On May 9, 2017, Darnell signed a minor league deal with the Los Angeles Dodgers. He did not appear in any games in the Dodgers farm system before he was released on June 1.

Somerset Patriots
On June 1, 2017, Darnell resigned with the Somerset Patriots of the Atlantic League of Professional Baseball.

Tampa Bay Rays
On July 5, 2017, Darnell signed a minor league deal with the Tampa Bay Rays. He elected free agency on November 6, 2017.

Washington Nationals
On January 3, 2018, Darnell signed a minor league contract with the Washington Nationals. He elected free agency on November 2, 2018.

Return to Somerset
On February 21, 2019, Darnell signed with the Somerset Patriots of the Atlantic League of Professional Baseball.

Sultanes de Monterrey
On July 4, 2019, Darnell's contract was purchased by the Sultanes de Monterrey of the Mexican League. He was released on February 18, 2020.

Uni-President Lions
On April 29, 2020, Darnell signed with the Uni-Lions of the Taiwan Professional Baseball League.
After the 2020 season, he played for Cardenales de Lara of the Liga Venezolana de Béisbol Profesional(LVMP). He has also played for Venezuela in the 2021 Caribbean Series.

References

External links

Kentucky Wildcats bio

1989 births
Living people
Águilas Cibaeñas players
American expatriate baseball players in the Dominican Republic
American expatriate baseball players in Mexico
American expatriate baseball players in Taiwan
Baseball players from Tennessee
Beloit Snappers players
Bravos de Margarita players
American expatriate baseball players in Venezuela
Caribes de Anzoátegui players
Elizabethton Twins players
Fort Myers Miracle players
Gigantes del Cibao players
Harrisburg Senators players
Kentucky Wildcats baseball players
Major League Baseball pitchers
Minnesota Twins players
Montgomery Biscuits players
New Britain Rock Cats players
People from Joelton, Tennessee
Peoria Javelinas players
Rochester Red Wings players
Somerset Patriots players
Sultanes de Monterrey players
Syracuse Chiefs players
Uni-President Lions players
Anchorage Glacier Pilots players
Cardenales de Lara players